The Pim is a river in the Khanty-Mansi Autonomous Okrug in Russia. It is a right tributary of the Ob. The river is frozen over from the end of November until May.

The town of Lyantor is along the Pim.

References

Rivers of Khanty-Mansi Autonomous Okrug